V26, or similar may refer to:
 Fokker V.26, a German World War I fighter aircraft prototype
 Twenty-five V 26, a Daimler straight-eight automobile engine
 V.26, a telecommunications recommendation of the ITU-T